Jack William Gurr (born 26 November 1995) is an English professional footballer who plays as a full-back for Sacramento Republic in the USL Championship.

Career

Youth, college and semi-professional
Gurr spent time with the academy team at Gateshead before moving to the United States in 2014 to play college soccer at Georgia Gwinnett College. He played four years for the Grizzlies, making 71 appearances and scoring 14 goals, and earning first team All-Association of Independent Institutions honours during his junior and senior seasons.

Following college, Gurr played two seasons with National Premier Soccer League club Georgia Revolution in 2018 and 2019.

Atlanta United
On 5 December 2019, it was announced that Gurr signed with USL Championship club Atlanta United 2 ahead of their 2020 season. He made his professional debut on 8 March 2020, starting in a 1–0 loss to Charleston Battery.

On 5 April 2021, Gurr was signed to the Atlanta United first-team roster. Gurr was released by Atlanta on 28 May 2021.

Aberdeen
On 21 June 2021, Gurr returned to the United Kingdom to join Scottish Premiership side Aberdeen, joining the club on a one-year deal.

Sacramento Republic
On 19 January 2022, Gurr returned to the United States to sign with USL Championship club Sacramento Republic.

References

External links

 Atlanta United profile
 
 
 Jack Gurr at FBRef.com
 

1995 births
Living people
English footballers
Footballers from Newcastle upon Tyne
Association football fullbacks
Gateshead F.C. players
Georgia Gwinnett Grizzlies men's soccer players
Georgia Revolution FC players
Atlanta United 2 players
Atlanta United FC players
Aberdeen F.C. players
Sacramento Republic FC players
USL Championship players
National Premier Soccer League players
Major League Soccer players
Scottish Professional Football League players
English expatriate footballers
Expatriate soccer players in the United States
English expatriate sportspeople in the United States